Wasu (Waçu, Wassú) is an extinct and unattested, presumed language of the Serra do Azul in Joaquim Gomes, Alagoas, Brazil. The ethnic population is about 1,500.

References

Further reading
 Fabre, Alain (2005): "Wassú" (Diccionario etnolingüístico y guía bibliográfica de los pueblos indígenas sudamericanos.)

Unattested languages of South America
Indigenous languages of Northeastern Brazil